Isostreptis is a genus of moth in the family Cosmopterigidae. It contains only one species, Isostreptis porphyrarga, which is found in China.

References

External links

Natural History Museum Lepidoptera genus database

Cosmopterigidae